Abdul Wahab "Alade" Aminu (born September 14, 1987) is a Nigerian-American professional basketball player for Gigantes de Carolina of the Baloncesto Superior Nacional (BSN). He played college basketball for the Georgia Tech Yellow Jackets, before playing professionally in France, Turkey, Italy, Israel, and Lebanon. In 2015–16, he was the top rebounder in the Israel Basketball Premier League.

Early life and college career
Aminu attended Stephenson High School in Stone Mountain, Georgia. He played college basketball for the Georgia Institute of Technology's Yellow Jackets.

In his freshman year at Georgia Tech, Aminu came off the bench in 24 games, averaging 2.4 points and 1.8 rebounds per game, while shooting 48.9% from the floor.

In his sophomore year, Aminu's role increased slightly, in which he played 18 games, averaging 5.4 points and 3.2 rebounds per game, shooting 58.3% from the floor (his best shooting percentage during his college career).

In his senior year, he averaged 11.8 points, 7.9 rebounds and 1.1 steals per game, shooting 52.2% from the floor.

Professional career

D-League (2009–2010)
After going undrafted in the 2009 NBA draft, Aminu joined the Washington Wizards for the 2009 NBA Summer League. On November 5, 2009, Aminu was selected with the 10th overall pick in the 2009 NBA D-League by the Fort Wayne Mad Ants. However, he was subsequently acquired by the Erie BayHawks in a trade. On February 13, 2010, Aminu participated in the 2010 D-League All-Star Game.

On March 2, 2010, The BayHawks sent Aminu in a trade to the Bakersfield Jam. In 9 games played for the Jam, he averaged 19.3 points and 9.2 rebounds per game.

On March 26, 2010, Aminu signed a 10-day contract with the Miami Heat. However, Aminu was later waived by the Heat on April 7.

Élan Chalon (2010–2012)
In July 2010, Aminu joined the Charlotte Bobcats and the Atlanta Hawks for the 2010 NBA Summer League.

On July 9, 2010, Aminu signed with the French team Élan Chalon for the 2010–11 season. On May 21, 2011, Aminu recorded a career-high 27 points, shooting 13-of-14 from the field, along with six rebounds in an 85–107 blowout loss to ASVEL Basket. Aminu won the 2011 French Cup with Chalon.

On June 13, 2011, Aminu signed a one-year contract extension with Chalon. In his second season with the team, Aminu won the a treble – the 2012 French Leaders Cup, the 2012 French Cup and the 2012 French League Championship titles with Chalon. In 54 games played during the 2011–12 season, he averaged 11.9 points, 6.7 rebounds and 1 steals per game.

Pınar Karşıyaka (2012–2013)
On August 24, 2012, Aminu signed with the Turkish team Pınar Karşıyaka for the 2012–13 season. Aminu helped Karşıyaka reach the 2013 FIBA EuroChallenge Finals, where they eventually lost to Krasnye Krylia.

Enel Brindisi and Banvit (2013–2014)
In July 2013, Aminu joined the Toronto Raptors for the 2013 NBA Summer League.

On September 23, 2013, Aminu signed a one-year deal with the Italian team Enel Brindisi. However, on December 30, 2013, Aminu parted ways with Brindisi. On January 6, 2014, Aminu returned to Turkey for a second stint, joining Banvit for the rest of the season. Aminu helped Banvit reach the 2014 Turkish League Semifinals, where they were eventually eliminated by Galatasaray.

TED Ankara (2014–2015)

On August 15, 2014, Aminu signed with TED Ankara for the 2014–15 season. On February 28, 2015, Aminu recorded a season-high 26 points without missing a single shot (12-of-12 from the field), along with eleven rebounds in an 85–97 loss to Eskişehir.

Hapoel Eilat (2015–2016)

On September 11, 2015, Aminu signed a one-year deal with the Israeli team Hapoel Eilat. On October 26, 2015, Aminu recorded a season-high 25 points, shooting 8-of-13 from the field, along with twelve rebounds, five assists and two steals in an 84–86 loss to Ironi Nahariya. On March 25, 2016, Aminu participated in the 2016 Israeli All-Star Game and the Slam Dunk Contest during the same event.

In 37 games played for Eilat, Aminu finished the season as the 2016 Israeli League Rebounding Leader with 10 rebounds per game, and third-leading player in efficiency rating (22.6 per game). He also averaged 14.7 points, 1.5 assists and 1.7 blocks per game. Aminu helped Eilat reach the 2016 Israeli League Semifinals, where they eventually lost to Hapoel Jerusalem.

Al Riyadi (2016–2017)
On August 8, 2016, Aminu signed with the Lebanese team Sporting Al Riyadi Beirut. In 37 games played during the 2016–17 season, he averaged 15 points, 9.3 rebounds, 1.5 assists. 1.3 steals and 1.1 blocks per game. Aminu won the 2017 Lebanese League Championship with Al Riyadi.

Nanterre 92 (2017–2018)
On July 28, 2017, Aminu returned to France for a second stint, signing a one-year deal with Nanterre 92. Aminu helped Nanterre reach the 2018 FIBA Champions League Round of 16, where they were eventually eliminated by his former team Banvit.

Hapoel Tel Aviv (2018–2019)
On July 26, 2018, Aminu signed with the Israeli team Hapoel Tel Aviv for the 2018–19 season. On November 19, 2018, Aminu recorded a season-highs 21 points and 13 rebounds, shooting 9-of-13 from the field, in an 85–62 win over Maccabi Rishon LeZion. Aminu helped Hapoel reach the 2019 Israeli League Playoffs, where they eventually were eliminated by Maccabi Tel Aviv in the Quarterfinals.

Polski Cukier Toruń (2019–2020)
On September 10, 2019, he has signed with Polski Cukier Toruń of the PLK.

Atléticos de San Germán / Gigantes de Carolina (2021–present)
On May 27, 2021, Aminu signed with Atléticos de San Germán of the Baloncesto Superior Nacional. However, he was released on May 1, 2022. The next day, he signed with Gigantes de Carolina.

Nigerian national team
Aminu is a member of the senior men's Nigerian national basketball team. He participated in the 2012 and the 2016 Summer Olympics.

In August 2015, Aminu helped the Nigerian team to win the 2015 AfroBasket and earning a gold medal.

Personal life
Aminu's father is Yoruba from Nigeria, and his mother is African American from New York City. He was born in Atlanta, and grew up in nearby Stone Mountain, Georgia. His brother, Al-Farouq, is a professional basketball player for the Orlando Magic of the NBA.

References

External links
 RealGM Profile
 TBLStat.net Profile
 Draftexpress.com Profile
 French League Profile 
 Georgia Tech College Profile
 

1987 births
Living people
American expatriate basketball people in France
American expatriate basketball people in Israel
American expatriate basketball people in Italy
American expatriate basketball people in Lebanon
American expatriate basketball people in Poland
American expatriate basketball people in Turkey
American men's basketball players
American people of Yoruba descent
American sportspeople of Nigerian descent
Bakersfield Jam players
Bandırma B.İ.K. players
Basketball players at the 2012 Summer Olympics
Basketball players at the 2016 Summer Olympics
Basketball players from Atlanta
Centers (basketball)
Élan Chalon players
Erie BayHawks (2008–2017) players
Georgia Tech Yellow Jackets men's basketball players
Hapoel Eilat basketball players
Hapoel Tel Aviv B.C. players
Israeli Basketball Premier League players
Karşıyaka basketball players
Nanterre 92 players
New Basket Brindisi players
Nigerian expatriate basketball people in France
Nigerian expatriate basketball people in Israel
Nigerian expatriate basketball people in Italy
Nigerian expatriate basketball people in Lebanon
Nigerian expatriate basketball people in Poland
Nigerian expatriate basketball people in Turkey
Nigerian men's basketball players
Olympic basketball players of Nigeria
People from Stone Mountain, Georgia
Power forwards (basketball)
TED Ankara Kolejliler players
Twarde Pierniki Toruń players
Yoruba sportspeople
Al Riyadi Club Beirut basketball players
Shahrdari Gorgan players